Loch Fyne is a fjord in the NE Greenland National Park area, East Greenland.

History
The fjord was explored and mapped in 1823 by British Arctic explorer Douglas Clavering during the Commissioners for the Discovery of the Longitude at Sea expedition. It was named after "Lock Fine" in Scotland. In the intervening years the spelling was corrected to "Loch Fyne" in maps of Scotland and in the maps of Greenland Danish cartographers adopted the modern corrected spelling as well.

There are a number of Norwegian and Danish cabins by the shores of this fjord. Both hunting areas and fishing grounds are good in the area of Loch Fyne.

Geography
Loch Fyne is located east of the Norlund Alps, between Hudson Land to the west and Hold with Hope in the east. Its mouth is in the Godthab Gulf to the north, between Cape Stosch, and Stromtangen.

See also
List of fjords of Greenland

References

External links
Den grønlandske Lods - Sejladsanvisninger Østgrønland
Loch Fyne - Isaaffik
On the Map of King Oscar Fjord and Kaiser Franz Josef Fjord in North-Eastern Greenland
Stordal-Moskusoksefjord-Badlanddal-Loch Fyne-Myggbukta - Birdlife
Fjords of Greenland